Prior Erskine Waverley Jones (6 June 1917 – 21 November 1991) was a West Indian cricketer who played in nine Test matches from 1947–48 to 1951–52.

A fast bowler, Jones played first-class cricket for Trinidad from 1940–41 to 1950–51. He toured India with the West Indian team in 1948–49, England in 1950, and played his last first-class matches on the tour to Australia and New Zealand in 1951–52. His best Test figures were 5 for 85 against India at Bombay in 1948–49. His best first-class figures were 7 for 29 against Yorkshire in 1950; and his best match figures were 10 for 62 (4 for 39 and 6 for 23) against Ceylon in 1948–49.

He also captained Trinidad at soccer.

References

External links
 

1917 births
1991 deaths
West Indies Test cricketers
Trinidad and Tobago footballers
Trinidad and Tobago cricketers
People from Princes Town region
Association footballers not categorized by position